Georg F. Striedter is an American scientist and professor in the Department of Neurobiology and Behavior at the University of California, Irvine.  He is the author of more than 30 papers in evolutionary neuroscience and the author of the book Principles of Brain Evolution. He is also the editor-in-chief of Brain, Behavior and Evolution. Striedter obtained his PhD in neuroscience from the University of California, San Diego, under the supervision of Glenn Northcutt in 1990.  He then pursued postdoctoral research at Caltech with Mark Konishi.

His research focuses on the organization and evolution of neuronal circuits in teleost fishes, the evolution of neuronal circuits for bird song learning in parrots and songbirds and how evolution modifies the processes of brain development to generate a broad diversity of adult brains.

Awards
Striedter received the C. J. Herrick Award in 1998 for his contributions to comparative neuroanatomy.  His book, Principles of Brain Evolution has been positively received by his academic colleagues (see the commentaries to his Precis of The Principles of Brain Evolution in Behavioral and Brain Sciences).  He has also received a Guggenheim Fellowship in 2009 to work on a new book, "provisionally titled Functional neurobiology: the human nervous system explored in light of the problems it helps us solve."

Major publications
 
 Striedter, G.F. (2003) Brain evolution. In: The Human Nervous System, 2nd edition. edited by G. Paxinos and J.K. Mai. San Diego, Academic Press.
 Striedter, G.F. (2003) Epigenesis and evolution of brains: From Embryonic Divisions to Functional Systems in Müller, G and Newman, S. Origination of Organismal Form: Beyond the Gene in Developmental and Evolutionary Biology.

Book
 Striedter, G.F. (2005). Principles of Brain Evolution Sinauer Associates, Sunderland, MA. .

See also
 Evolutionary neuroscience
 Evolutionary biology

References

External links
 U.C. Irvine Faculty bio
 Laboratory website at UCI

American neuroscientists
Living people
Academic journal editors
University of California, Irvine faculty
Year of birth missing (living people)
American textbook writers